Killswitch Engage is the debut studio album by American metalcore band Killswitch Engage, released July 4, 2000 through Ferret Music. The album is the only release ever by Killswitch Engage to be released through Ferret, the band would later be signed to Roadrunner Records, where their follow-up LP, Alive or Just Breathing was released. The band's debut is considered to be one of the first ever successful albums in the metalcore genre, garnering a re-release five years after its original pressing. No songs in the album were released as singles.

In 2020, it was named one of the 20 best metal albums of 2000 by Metal Hammer magazine.

History
The song "Soilborn" was the first song the band ever wrote, which took shape during the band's first jam session together, also mentioned in From the Bedroom to the Basement. The band wrote the entire album's music without a singer, until Jesse Leach of local band Nothing Stays Gold (who were signed to Dutkiewicz's brother Tobias' record label, Tobias also being the singer for Aftershock) joined the band shortly after its formation. Many of the songs were then recorded for a demo, which included "Soilborn", before the recording of the band's debut full-length.

While writing the album, bassist D'Antonio asked Ferret Music if they could sign his band as a favor since D'Antonio illustrated the covers for some of the albums released through the label. Ferret were said to have signed Killswitch Engage mainly because metal was becoming less and less popular at the time, and representatives felt that they might be the last metal band they would ever sign.

The tracks "Temple from the Within" and "Vide Infra" were re-released for Alive or Just Breathing (2002), while "Irreversal" was re-recorded for The End of Heartache (2004) and "In the Unblind" was re-recorded for the Alive or Just Breathing 2005 re-release bonus disc.

In 2005, Ferret Music also released a remastered version of the album, with four demo tracks from a 1999 demo, which was originally sold at a show within which Killswitch Engage, Shadows Fall and In Flames played together at The Palladium in Worcester, Massachusetts, which apparently sold incredibly well, as said in the documentary feature From the Bedroom to the Basement from the live DVD (Set This) World Ablaze.  Subsequent releases in 2005 and 2007 were handled by Roadrunner Records.

Track listing

Personnel
Killswitch Engage
 Jesse Leach – vocals
 Joel Stroetzel – guitar
 Mike D'Antonio – bass guitar
 Adam Dutkiewicz – drums
Production
Produced by Adam Dutkiewicz
Mastered by Keith Chirgwin

References

Killswitch Engage albums
2000 debut albums
Albums produced by Adam Dutkiewicz